Thandokuhle Theophilus Mkhonza  (born 1 June 1980) is a South African professional footballer who plays for FC AK, as a goalkeeper.

Playing career
Born in Piet Retief, Mpumalanga, Mkhonza began his career playing with local sides Sprinter Lovers, Dobsonville All Nations and Spartak. He signed with Premier Soccer League side Jomo Cosmos in August 2002, and made his professional debut for the club in March 2003. He moved to FC AK for the 2012–13 season.

References

1980 births
Living people
Association football goalkeepers
South African soccer players
Jomo Cosmos F.C. players
F.C. AK players